Thomas Christie (March 8, 1834 – August 5, 1902) was a Scottish-born physician, professor and political figure in Quebec. He represented Argenteuil in the House of Commons of Canada from 1875 to 1880 and from 1891 to 1902 as a Liberal member.

He was born in Glasgow, the son of John Christie and Elizabeth Nichol, and came to Lower Canada with his parents in 1827. Christie was educated at McGill University, receiving an M.D. In 1849, he married Catherine McMartin. He was chairman of the board of school commissioners. Christie also served as mayor of Jerusalem parish and of Lachute and as warden for Argenteuil County. Christie helped establish the Lachute Academy in 1855 and also served as lecturer and secretary for the academy. Christie was first elected to the House of Commons in an 1875 by-election held after the election of Lemuel Cushing was overturned. He was elected again in 1878, but that election was overturned on appeal. He lost two subsequent by-elections to John Abbott and was later reelected in 1891, 1896 and 1900. Christie died in office in 1902 at the age of 75.

His son Thomas succeeded him as representative for Argenteuil in the House of Commons in 1902.

References 
 
The Canadian parliamentary companion, 1891, JA Gemmill

1834 births
1902 deaths
Members of the House of Commons of Canada from Quebec
Liberal Party of Canada MPs
Mayors of places in Quebec
McGill University Faculty of Medicine alumni
British emigrants to Canada